Bangladesh made its first Test tour of Sri Lanka in July–August 2002, playing 2 Tests and 3 One Day Internationals (ODIs). Sri Lanka won all five matches to whitewash Bangladesh in both the Test and the ODI series. 
Sri Lanka was captained by Sanath Jayasuriya and Bangladesh was captained by Khaled Mashud in both the formats.

Test series

1st Test

2nd Test

ODI series

1st ODI

2nd ODI

3rd ODI

External links

2002 in Bangladeshi cricket
2002 in Sri Lankan cricket
2002
International cricket competitions in 2002
Sri Lankan cricket seasons from 2000–01